1963 was the 64th season of County Championship cricket in England. Limited overs cricket began with the first edition of the knockout competition that was originally called the Gillette Cup. The highlight of the season was a memorable Test series between England and West Indies which the tourists won 3–1. Yorkshire won their second consecutive championship title. Off the field, the year saw the publication of the hundredth edition of Wisden Cricketers' Almanack, as well as the deaths of two cricketing knights, Sir Jack Hobbs and Sir Pelham Warner.

Honours
County Championship – Yorkshire
Gillette Cup – Sussex
Minor Counties Championship – Cambridgeshire
Second XI Championship - Worcestershire II 
Wisden – Brian Close, Charlie Griffith, Conrad Hunte, Rohan Kanhai, Gary Sobers

Test series

West Indies tour

There was a memorable series between England and West Indies. The tourists won 3–1 with one match drawn. The Lord's Test had one of the most exciting finishes ever and all four results were possible with two balls to be bowled: it ended as a draw with England five runs behind and their last pair batting. Colin Cowdrey had gone in as number 11 with a broken arm, but did not have to face a ball.

As a result of the great success of this series, England's future home Test programme was revised so that West Indies could return in 1966, much earlier than originally planned. This was done by introducing "twin tours", in which two countries would each play three Tests against England in the course of a season.

County Championship

Gillette Cup

Leading batsmen

Leading bowlers

References

Annual reviews
 Playfair Cricket Annual 1964
 Wisden Cricketers' Almanack 1964

External links
 CricketArchive – season summary

1963 in English cricket
English cricket seasons in the 20th century